Gymnoscelis tristrigosa is a moth in the family Geometridae. It was described by Arthur Gardiner Butler in 1880. It is found from Sri Lanka and Taiwan to Fiji, Tonga and New Caledonia.

Description
Palpi much shorter. Forewings long and narrow, especially in male. Body rufous, slightly with black irrorations (speckles). Head, thorax, and abdomen with black markings. Forewings with diffused black fascia from base of inner margin to the costa at the origin of the postmedial line, which is indistinct and angled at vein 4. The fascia then narrowing and continued above vein 4 to outer margin. Hindwings with a postmedial line highly angled at vein 6. A curved slightly waved submarginal line.

The larvae feed on the young foliage and flowers of Heptapleurum species, often webbing them.

Taxonomy
The species belongs to a species complex clustered around Gymnoscelis imparatalis.

Subspecies
Gymnoscelis tristrigosa tristrigosa
Gymnoscelis tristrigosa nasuta Prout, 1958
Gymnoscelis tristrigosa tongaica Prout, 1958

References

Moths described in 1880
tristrigosa
Moths of Japan
Taxa named by Arthur Gardiner Butler